John Mortimer Courtney,  (July 22, 1838 – October 8, 1920) was a Canadian civil servant.

Born in Penzance, England, the second son of John Sampson Courtney and Sarah Mortimer, Courtney worked at Mount's Bay Bank in Penzance, then to India with the Agra Bank in Calcutta and in New South Wales, Australia and finally with Royal Bank of India. In 1869, he joined the Public Service of Canada working under John Langton as a chief clerk and assistant secretary to the Treasury Board. In 1878, he was promoted to deputy minister and ex officio deputy receiver general and secretary to the Treasury Board. He retired in 1906.

His brother Leonard Courtney, 1st Baron Courtney of Penwith, was a British politician and man of letters.

He was appointed Companion of the Order of St Michael and St George in 1898 and Companion of the Imperial Service Order in 1903.

References

1838 births
1920 deaths
19th-century Canadian civil servants
20th-century Canadian civil servants
Canadian Companions of the Imperial Service Order
Canadian Companions of the Order of St Michael and St George
Cornish diaspora
People from Penzance